Broderick Henderson (born February 21, 1957) is a Democratic member of the Kansas House of Representatives, representing the 35th district.  He has served since 1995.

Henderson works as the Director of Parking Control for Kansas City.

Committee membership
 Commerce and Labor
 Federal and State Affairs
 Government Efficiency and Fiscal Oversight
 Joint Committee on Special Claims Against the State

Major donors
The top 5 donors to Talia's 2008 campaign:
1. Kansans for Lifesaving Cures 	$700
2. Chesapeake Energy 	$500 	
3. Kansas Assoc of Realtors 	$500 	
4. Ruffin, Phil 	$500 	
5. Kansas Contractors Assoc 	$500

References

External links
 Kansas Legislature - Broderick Henderson
 Project Vote Smart profile
 Kansas Votes profile
 State Surge - Legislative and voting track record
 Follow the Money campaign contributions:
 1996, 2002, 2004, 2008

Democratic Party members of the Kansas House of Representatives
Living people
1957 births
Politicians from Kansas City, Kansas
African-American state legislators in Kansas
21st-century American politicians
20th-century American politicians
20th-century African-American politicians
21st-century African-American politicians